Shelby Kutty is an Indian-born American cardiologist, a professor of pediatrics and internal medicine at the Johns Hopkins University School of Medicine. He holds the Helen B. Taussig endowed professorship at Johns Hopkins and is Director of the Helen B. Taussig Heart Center at the Johns Hopkins Hospital. Prior to this, he held the title of assistant dean for research and development and vice chair of pediatrics at the University of Nebraska Medical Center College of Medicine.

Education
Kutty was educated in India where he obtained his MBBS and a postgraduate medical degree before proceeding to Royal Children’s Hospital, University of Melbourne  and the Hospital for Sick Children in Toronto, Canada where he trained in pediatric cardiology. He received his residency training at the Nicklaus Children's Hospital, Miami, Florida and then enrolled for his fellowship training at the Cleveland Clinic. He trained in cardiac MRI at the Boston Children's Hospital and secured a master’s degree in Healthcare Management from Harvard University and later obtained a PhD.

Clinical career and leadership 
Kutty specializes in cardiovascular imaging for children and adults with congenital heart disease, including echocardiography, magnetic resonance imaging, computed tomography and preventive cardiology. Kutty left the UNMC College of Medicine in 2018 after an 11-year tenure as a clinician-scientist following his appointment at Johns Hopkins School of Medicine to lead Pediatric and Congenital Cardiology. He played a role in the development of the Blalock-Taussig-Thomas Heart Center at Johns Hopkins Medicine in 2019, and participated in clinical programs in materno-fetal cardiac health, adult congenital heart disease, community cardiology, and cardiac catheterization at Hopkins.

Research and Scientific career 
His research focuses on investigating myocardial function, right heart disease, and new ultrasound applications. he has led multi-center clinical trials and serves on the editorial boards of international cardiology journals. His work on microbubble contrast agents, ultrasound-mediated cavitation, and targeted ultrasound therapies was funded by the American Heart Association and the National Institute of Health from 2011 to 2018. In 2020 and 2021, Kutty’s team was awarded grants from the National Institutes of Health to lead data science approaches to manage Multisystem Inflammatory Syndrome in Children (MIS-C) and post-acute sequelae associated with SARS-CoV-2 infection.

Honors 
Kutty was honored with the Arthur Weyman Investigator Award (2010) by the American Society of Echocardiography for his work in cardiac imaging and the Harvey Feigenbaum lectureship award in 2020. He was the recipient of 2019 Distinguished Scientist Award from the university of Nebraska Medical Center.

Selected publications 
 Kutty S, Jones PG, Karels Q, Joseph N, Spertus JA, Chan PS. Association of Pediatric Medical Emergency Teams With Hospital Mortality. Circulation. 2018 Jan 2;137(1):38-46. doi: 10.1161/CIRCULATIONAHA.117.029535. Epub 2017 Oct 4. PubMed ; PubMed Central PMCID: PMC5839663.

References

External links
 

American cardiologists
Year of birth missing (living people)
Living people
Indian emigrants to the United States
Harvard University alumni
Indian expatriates in Canada
Indian expatriates in Australia
Johns Hopkins University faculty